Grabownica Starzeńska  (Hrabivnytsia) is a village in the administrative district of Gmina Brzozów, within Brzozów County, Subcarpathian Voivodeship, in south-eastern Poland.

The village has a population of 3,000.

Gallery

References

Villages in Brzozów County